Unity College, Dimapur, is a general degree college in Dimapur, Nagaland. It offers undergraduate courses in arts and commerce. This college is affiliated to Nagaland University. This college was established in 2007.

Departments

Arts and Commerce
English 
History 
Political Science 
Sociology
Economics
Education
Commerce

Accreditation
The college is recognized by the University Grants Commission (UGC).

References

External links
http://unitycollegedimapur.com/

Colleges affiliated to Nagaland University
Universities and colleges in Nagaland
Educational institutions established in 2007
2007 establishments in Nagaland